Sound Forge (formerly known as Sonic Foundry Sound Forge, and later as Sony Sound Forge) is a digital audio editing suite by Magix Software GmbH, which is aimed at the professional and semi-professional markets. There are two versions of Sound Forge: Sound Forge Pro 12 released in April 2018 and Sound Forge Audio Studio 13 (formerly known as Sonic Foundry's Sound Forge LE) released in January 2019. Both are well known digital audio editors and offer recording, audio editing, audio mastering and processing.

In 2003, Sonic Foundry, the former parent company of Sound Forge, faced losses and tough competition from much larger companies; and, as a result, agreed to sell its desktop audio and music production product family to Sony Pictures Digital for $18 million. The software initially had Windows 3.x support, but after version 3.0 all support for 16-bit Windows was dropped. Additionally, Windows 95 support was dropped after Sound Forge 5.0.

On May 20, 2016, Sony announced that it would be selling the bulk of its creative software suite, including Sound Forge Pro, to Magix GmbH & Co. Magix announced via Facebook that their first new version of Sound Forge Audio Studio (Sound Forge Audio Studio 12) was released August 2017.

Features
 Multi-channel or multitrack Recording
 Voice activity detection using artificial intelligence
 Disc Description Protocol export
 High resolution audio support: 24-Bit, 32-Bit, 64-bit (IEEE float) 192 kHz 
 Video support including AVI, WMV, and MPEG-1 and MPEG-2 (both PAL and NTSC) for use in frame by frame synchronization of audio and video 
 Real-time sample level wave editor
 Ultra-high fidelity 
 Support for a wide variety of file formats: DSF (DSD), AA3/OMA (ATRAC), GIG (GigaSampler instrument), IVC (Intervoice), MP4 (including Apple Lossless), MPEG‑2 transport stream and PCA (Sony Perfect Clarity Audio). For working with audio‑for‑video, Pro 12 includes versatile video file support AVI, WMV, MPEG‑1 and MPEG‑2 (in PAL or NTSC) file formats
 DirectX and VST3 plugin support. Version 12 includes a vinyl restoration plug-in and Mastering Effects Bundle, powered by IZotope
 Floating Plug-in Chain window for non-destructive effects processing
 CD Architect 5.2 software that allows Disk-At-Once (DAO) CD burning
 Batch conversion functionality
 Spectrum analysis tools
 White, pink, brown and filtered noise generators
 DTMF/MF tone synthesis
 External monitor support for DV and FireWire (IEEE 1394) devices

Supported formats

 Macromedia Flash (SWF) format open only 
 RealMedia 9 (RealAudio and RealVideo) - export only
 Windows Media 9 Series (WMA and WMV) (i)
 Microsoft Video for Windows (AVI) (i)
 AIFF (AIFF, AIF, SND)
 MPEG-1 and MPEG-2
 MPEG-1 Layer 3 (MP3)
 Ogg Vorbis (OGG)
 Macintosh AIFF
 NeXT/Sun (AU)
 Sound Designer (DIG)
 Intervoice (IVC)
 Sony Perfect Clarity Audio (PCA)
 Sony Media Wave 64 (W64) (i)
 Sound Forge Project Files (FRG)
 Dialogic (VOX)
 Microsoft Wave (WAV)
 ATRAC Audio (AA3, OMA) (i)
 CD Audio (CDA) 
 Dolby Digital AC-3 studio - save only (i)
 Raw Audio (RAW) (i)
 Free Lossless Audio Codec (FLAC)

(i): Supported multichannel format

See also 
 ACID Pro
 Samplitude
 Audacity
 Ardour
 FL Studio
 Steinberg Cubase
 Pro Tools
 REAPER
 Comparison of multitrack recording software

References

External links 
 Sound Forge Product Family
 Sound Forge Pro
 Sound Forge Audio Studio
 Sonic Foundry website
 Sony press release

Digital audio workstation software
Soundtrack creation software
Magix software